Frame Lake is a territorial electoral district for the Legislative Assembly of Northwest Territories, Canada.

It is one of seven districts that represent Yellowknife.

Members of the Legislative Assembly (MLAs)

Election results

2019 election

2015 election

2011 election

2007 election

2003 election

1999 election

1995 election

1991 election

Notes

References

External links 
Website of the Legislative Assembly of Northwest Territories

Northwest Territories territorial electoral districts
Yellowknife